Marvin Karlins (October 4, 1941) is a Professor of Management at the University of South Florida.

He was born on October 4, 1941, in Minneapolis, Minnesota. He received his B.A. degree from the University of Minnesota and his Ph.D. in Psychology from Princeton University. Karlins specialised in international consultation with a focus on aviation industry. He is currently Professor of Management in the College of Business at the University of South Florida.

Karlins is a contributor to Psychology Today. An avid poker player, he is considered an expert in the "psychology of gambling".

References

Living people
1941 births
University of South Florida faculty
University of Minnesota alumni
Princeton University alumni
People from Riverview, Hillsborough County, Florida